Lilac Time is a 1928 American silent romantic war film directed by George Fitzmaurice and starring Colleen Moore and Gary Cooper.  The film is about young American aviators fighting for Britain during World War I who are billeted in a field next to a farmhouse in France. The daughter who lives on the farm meets one of the new aviators who is attracted to her. As the flyers head off on a mission, the young aviator promises to return to her.

Lilac Time was produced by John McCormick (Moore's husband), and distributed by First National Pictures. The silent film "adaptation" by Willis Goldbeck is based on a 1917 Broadway play written by Jane Murfin and actress Jane Cowl. Though some sources erroneously cite the play as having been based on a novel by Guy Fowler, the reverse is true: Fowler novelized the Goldbeck adaptation for the popular line of Grosset & Dunlap Photoplay Editions, also drawing upon text and dialogue of the play itself. Lilac Time offers several phases, beginning with slapstick comedy elements, becoming an intense romantic film, then segueing into a spectacular aerial showdown. This was followed by a duel in the sky between Cooper's character and the "Red Ace" before returning to romantic complications.

Plot
Seven young English aviators are billeted at the Berthelot farm near the French front. One of the flyers, Philip Blythe (Gary Cooper) is a replacement pilot who falls in love with the farmer's daughter, Jeannie (Colleen Moore), She loves Philip, and on the morning before a dangerous mission he also declares his love for her.

Philip is shot down, and Jeannie helps an ambulance crew to extricate his apparently lifeless body from the wrecked aircraft. The crew will not allow Jeannie to accompany Philip and cannot tell her where they are taking him.

Jeannie obtains an address for the military army hospital where he is. When she visits, she is told that he has died from his wounds, based on incorrect records. Jeannie sends a bouquet of lilacs to his room in remembrance, and Philip, recognizing the flowers as her gift, painfully drags himself to his window in time to call her back to him.

Cast

 Colleen Moore as Jeannine Berthelot
 Gary Cooper as Captain Philip Blythe
 Burr McIntosh as General Blyth
 George Cooper as Mechanic's helper
 Cleve Moore as Captain Russell
 Kathryn McGuire as Lady Iris Rankin
 Eugenie Besserer as Madame Berthelot
 Émile Chautard as The Mayor
 Jack Stone as The Kid
 Edward Dillon as Mike the Mechanic
 Dick Grace as Aviator
 Stuart Knox as Aviator
 Harlan Hilton as Aviator
 Richard Jarvis as Aviator
 Jack Ponder as Aviator
 Dan Dowling as Aviator
 Eddie Clayton as The Enemy Ace
 Arthur Lake as The Unlucky One
 Philo McCullough as German Officer
 Nelson McDowell as French Drummer

Production

Lilac Time was shot on sets at First National's Burbank studio and on location in El Toro, California, where a working airstrip, full-sized French village and farm serving as a base for a fictional Royal Flying Corps squadron, were built. For some scenes, the deserted village in Allaire, New Jersey were used for backdrops. In addition a portable machine shop serviced the seven Waco 10 biplanes purchased and leased by aerial coordinator Dick Grace for the production.

The crash scenes in Lilac Time turned out to be particularly difficult and hazardous. One scene called for Grace to crash and flip upside down in an aircraft. The second crash scene involved a crash-landing where the aircraft pirouetted on its nose and nearly hitting Opal Boswell, Moore's double, who scampered out of the way at the last moment. The third crash pitted a Waco 10 against a stand of eucalyptus trees that tore off the wings of the taxiing aircraft.

Looking for realism, many extras cast as soldiers in the film had been actual World War I soldiers, in the ranks they portrayed. The chief stunt pilot, Dick Grace, had only finished doing stunt work on the Paramount film Wings (1927) nearly two months earlier. Grace sustained a severe neck injury in a stunt crash while making Wings but recovered in time for Lilac Time.

Among those in the cast were Colleen Moore's brother Cleve (billed as "Cleve Moore") and her cousin, Jack Stone. Eugenie Besserer had played "Mrs. Goode," a mother figure in Colleen's earlier film Little Orphant Annie, the first film to bring Colleen a measure of fame.

Reception
Lilac Time had its opening in Los Angeles at the Carthay Circle Theatre where, in the lobby, among other promotional materials on display, was the wrecked fuselage of one of the aircraft that had been destroyed during the filming. The film cost one million dollars to produce, an amount equal to Moore's previous two films. The studio recouped the cost of the film within months. By the end of 1928, the film had out-performed Moore's earlier star vehicle Flaming Youth (1923).

Lilac Time was released with a Vitaphone score and music effects, featuring the song "Jeannine, I Dream of Lilac Time," but there was no spoken dialogue. The film premiered in New York City on August 3, 1928, and was released in the United States on October 18, 1928.

Aviation film historian James H. Farmer in Celluloid Wings: The Impact of Movies on Aviation (1984), described Lilac Time, as "Overly sentimental; somewhat redeemed by the film's original aerial sequences, including several crashes; all of which were shot specifically for the production."

Aviation film historian Stephen Pendo, inAviation in the Cinema (1985) had similar views about Lilac Time, noting, "of all the aviation films of the period, 'Lilac Time' stands out as one of the most sentimental ..." The same comment about the sentimentality of Lilac Time is echoed by aviation film historian Michael Paris in From the Wright Brothers to Top Gun: Aviation, Nationalism, and Popular Cinema, (1995).

Accolades
Lilac Time is recognized by American Film Institute in these lists:
 2002: AFI's 100 Years...100 Passions – Nominated

See also
List of early Warner Bros. sound and talking features

References

Notes

Citations

Bibliography

 Codori, Jeff. Colleen Moore; A Biography of the Silent Film Star. Jefferson, North Carolina: McFarland Publishing, 2012. .
 Farmer, James H. Celluloid Wings: The Impact of Movies on Aviation (1st ed.). Blue Ridge Summit, Pennsylvania: TAB Books 1984. .
 Paris, Michael. From the Wright Brothers to Top Gun: Aviation, Nationalism, and Popular Cinema. Manchester, UK: Manchester University Press, 1995. .
 Pendo, Stephen. Aviation in the Cinema. Lanham, Maryland: Scarecrow Press, 1985. .
 Sitkus, Hance Morton. Allaire (NJ) (Images of America). Mount Pleasant, South Carolina: Arcadia Publishing, 2002. .
 Wynne, H. Hugh. The Motion Picture Stunt Pilots and Hollywood's Classic Aviation Movies. Missoula, Montana: Pictorial Histories Publishing Co., 1987. .

External links

Lilac Time at Virtual History
Stills at silenthollywood.com
Stills at silentfilmstillarchive.com

1928 films
American silent feature films
Films directed by George Fitzmaurice
1920s romance films
American aviation films
First National Pictures films
Transitional sound films
American black-and-white films
Films based on adaptations
Films based on works by Jane Cowl
Films based on works by Jane Murfin
American war films
American romance films
Films scored by Nathaniel Shilkret
War romance films
Films shot in New Jersey
1920s American films
Silent war films